Grammopsis is a genus of beetles in the family Cerambycidae, containing the following species:

 Grammopsis clavigera (Bates, 1866)
 Grammopsis fallax (Lameere, 1893)
 Grammopsis parvula (Newman, 1840)
 Grammopsis simoni (Lameere, 1893)

References

Agapanthiini